Castelar e Nelson Dantas no País dos Generais (English: Castelar and Nelson Dantas Country of Generals) is a 2007 Brazilian documentary film directed by Carlos Alberto Prates Correia.

Synopsis 
The film is a multifaceted account in which the director's cinematic reminiscences blend with a fictional narrative, establishing a different genre in which document and fiction intertwine under the baton of irony.

Cast 
Tavinho Moura ...Schubert
Priscila Assum ...Noeme
Rafaela Amado ...Lollô
Andrea Dantas ...narrator
Lina de Carlo ...Prisoner
Regina Coelho ...Lyric singer)
Leilany Fernandes ...Torturer
Joaquim Pedro de Andrade ...Himself (archive image)
Alberto Graça ...Himself (archive image)
Schubert Magalhães ...Himself (archive image)
Humberto Mauro ...Himself (archive image)
Carlos Alberto Prates Correia ...Himself (archive image)
Andrea Tonacci ...Himself (archive image)

Accolades
The film won two awards at 2007 Gramado Film Festival including Best Picture.

References

External links 
Castelar e Nelson Dantas no País dos Generais on IMDb

2007 films
Brazilian documentary films
Films about Brazilian military dictatorship
2007 documentary films
2000s Portuguese-language films